Tottering Towers is a British comedy television series which originally aired on ITV from 1971 to 1972.

Cast
 William Mervyn as Duke of Tottering
 Tim Barrett as 'Soapy' Cyril
 Robert Gillespie as Marmaduke
 Stacey Gregg as  Daffy
 Avice Landone as Mrs. Pouncer
 Leon Lissek as Geko
 David Lodge as PC Poppy 
 John Louis Mansi as 'Fingers' Fish
 Magda Miller as Mimi
 Tom Owen as Dick 
 Patsy Rowlands as Miss Twitty
 David Stoll as Gabbige
 Talfryn Thomas as Prayer-book Perce
 Harry Towb as  Hairy O'Hara 
 Vic Wise as Benny the Nose

References

Bibliography
 Maxford, Howard. Hammer Complete: The Films, the Personnel, the Company. McFarland, 2018.

External links
 
 Article at nostalgiacentral.com
 Article at thetvdb.com

1971 British television series debuts
1972 British television series endings
1970s British comedy television series
English-language television shows
ITV comedy